The French sculptor François Christophe Armand Toussaint was born in Paris on April 7, 1806, and died there on May 24, 1862.

The son of a locksmith, Armand Toussaint entered the École des Beaux-Arts in 1827 and studied under David d'Angers. In 1832, he won the second Grand Prix de Rome for his Capanée foudroyé sous les murs de Thèbes. He exhibited at the Salon between 1836 and 1850, winning a third-class medal in 1839 for his Jésus Christ environné de petits enfants and a second class in 1847 for his Une esclave indienne portant une torche.

As well as working on his own projects, Toussaint was professor of sculpture at the École des Beaux Arts and carried out several official and church commissions. Around 1850 he was included among those working in Notre Dame de Paris to restore sculptures destroyed during the French Revolution. In 1852, he was made a Knight of the Legion of Honor.

He is buried in the cemetery of Montmartre. On his tomb is a bronze medallion by his former student Charles Gumery.

A well known work of his in the United States is the statue of Persephone located in Indianapolis, created around 1840.

References

19th-century French sculptors
French male sculptors
Chevaliers of the Légion d'honneur
Artists from Paris
1862 deaths
1806 births
Burials at Montmartre Cemetery
19th-century French male artists